Morghak or Marghak may refer to:
 Morghak-e Olya, Kerman Province
 Morghak-e Yek, Alborz Province